Cifra may refer to:

 Cifra 3, a classic clock designed by Gino Valle in 1955
 La cifra, a 1789 opera by Antonio Salieri
 CIFRA - González, Raga y Asociados, a Uruguayan polling consultancy
 Antonio Cifra (1584–1629), Italian Baroque composer
 Anita Cifra (born 1989), Hungarian handballer
 Cifra (musical genre) Folkloric music genre from Argentina and Uruguay
 Cifra, a Mexican retail store founded in 1952, now Walmart de México y Centroamérica

See also 
 Cziffra

Italian-language surnames